The Tiger 4x4 Armored Reconnaissance Scout Vehicle was one of several vehicles proposed to the Hellenic Army by Namco, a Greek vehicle manufacturer. The particular vehicle was designed in 1982.

Namco published an advertising brochure for the vehicle including a detailed depiction (drawing) and technical specifications (power provided by a  Chrysler engine), as well as a photograph of what appeared to be a vehicle prototype. However, it has not been confirmed that a functioning prototype was completed.

Other vehicles, including an APC based on the company's Milicar truck chassis and a jeep-type 4x4 vehicle do not seem to have passed the design stage. Namco had made a reasonable investment on military trucks and vehicles, realizing that its "bread-winning" Pony-Citroen was near the end of its career. However, for a number of reasons, including the Greek state's "preference" for vehicles produced by Steyr-Hellas (now ELBO) few (trucks) or none (armored vehicles) were ordered by the Greek state, with almost catastrophic results for this company.

References

L.S. Skartsis and G.A. Avramidis, "Made in Greece", Typorama, Patras, Greece (2003)

Armoured fighting vehicles of Greece
Armoured cars
Reconnaissance vehicles of the Cold War